Brookula enderbyensis is a species of minute sea snail, a marine gastropod mollusc, unassigned in the superfamily Seguenzioidea.

Distribution
This species is found only at the Auckland Islands, New Zealand.

References

enderbyensis
Gastropods described in 1931